(Spirit and soul become confused), 35, is a church cantata by Johann Sebastian Bach. He composed the solo cantata for alto voice in Leipzig for the twelfth Sunday after Trinity and first performed it on 8 September 1726.

Bach composed the cantata in his fourth year as Thomaskantor (musical director) in Leipzig. The text is based on the day's prescribed reading from the Gospel of Mark, the healing of a deaf mute man. The librettist is Georg Christian Lehms, whose poetry Bach had used already in Weimar as the basis for solo cantatas. The text quotes ideas from the gospel and derives from these the analogy that as the tongue of the deaf mute man was opened, the believer should be open to admire God's miraculous deeds. The cantatas for this Sunday have a positive character, which Bach stressed in earlier works for the occasion by including trumpets in the score. In this work, he uses instead an obbligato solo organ in several movements.

The cantata is structured in seven movements in two parts, to be performed before and after the sermon. Both parts are opened by an instrumental sinfonia with solo organ, probably derived from concerto music composed earlier in Weimar or Köthen. The alto singer performs a sequence of alternating arias and recitatives, accompanied in all three arias by the organ as an equal partner. The Baroque instrumental ensemble is formed by two oboes, taille, strings and basso continuo. The alto part is demanding and was probably written with a specific singer in mind, as with the two other solo cantatas composed in the same period.

History and words 
It is regarded as part of his third cantata cycle.

The prescribed readings for the Sunday were from the Second Epistle to the Corinthians, the ministry of the Spirit, and from the Gospel of Mark, the healing of a deaf mute man. The text connects the healing of the deaf man to the thoughts of the believer who is left deaf and mute in awe looking at the healing of Jesus and God's creation. The text of the second aria is almost a quote of the gospel's last verse.

Because of the requirements that "new music" be composed as often as possible, Bach seldom chose older poems for his cantatas; consequently, the conductor Craig Smith has suggested that parts of this work may have been composed earlier than the first recorded Leipzig performance. Bach had already composed his first solo cantata on a text by Lehms, composed during his tenure in Weimar, also for an alto soloist.

It seems likely that Bach had a capable alto singer at his disposal during this period.

Bach had earlier composed two other cantatas for the twelfth Sunday after Trinity, in his first year in Leipzig Lobe den Herrn, meine Seele, BWV 69a, first performed on 15 August 1723, and in his third year Lobe den Herren, den mächtigen König der Ehren, BWV 137, first performed on 19 August 1725, as an added part of his cycle of chorale cantatas. Both works focus on praise (Lob) and use an orchestra including festive trumpets.

Furthermore, the work has two large concerto movements for organ and orchestra, probably from a lost concerto for keyboard, oboe or violin, perhaps indicating that the cantata was composed for a seasonal choral absentia at Thomaskirche. The first nine bars of the opening sinfonia are practically identical to the fragment BWV 1059.

Bach led the first performance on 8 September 1726, and probably played the organ part himself.

Structure and scoring 
Bach structured the cantata in two parts, four movements to be performed before the sermon, three after the sermon. Both parts begin with a sinfonia. Bach scored the cantata for an alto soloist and a Baroque instrumental ensemble of two oboes (Ob), taille (Ot), obbligato solo organ (Org), two violins (Vl), viola (Va), and basso continuo (Bc).

In the following table of the movements, the scoring follows the Neue Bach-Ausgabe. The keys and time signatures are taken from Alfred Dürr, using the symbol for common time (4/4). The instruments are shown separately for winds, strings, and organ and continuo.

Music

John Eliot Gardiner, who conducted this work on the twelfth Sunday after Trinity in St. Jakob, Köthen as part of the Bach Cantata Pilgrimage with the Monteverdi Choir in 2000, calls the occasion "one of the most cheerful programmes of the whole Trinity season", leading Bach to compose "celebratory pieces", two with trumpets and timpani, and finally this one with an obbligato organ. In an expanded two-part structure, the organ is both an instrumental soloist in the two sinfonias and a partner for the singer in all three arias. The musicologist Laurence Dreyfus distinguished Bach's use of the organ as "sacred icon" versus "galant conversationalist", writing on Bach's "assimilation of the secular solo concerto into his church cantatas and his adjustment of the normal concerto principle, that of soloist-versus-orchestra, through subtle shifts in role playing, the instrument now posing as a soloist, now retreating into the background."

1 
The opening allegro sinfonia incorporates concerto techniques, suggesting an origin in a pre-existing concerto. The organ performs both the solo melody and the continuo line, punctuated by quasi-cadenza passages and interspersed ten-measure ritornellos. The musicologist Klaus Hofmann notes that in the movement in Italian style, the theme is "subjected to intensive thematic working-out in the dialogue between solo instrument and orchestra".

2 
The first aria in da capo form, "" (Spirit and soul become confused), is characterized by a broken ritornello and a sense of confusion and uncertainty. The rhythm is siciliano, a frequent feature in slow concerto movements by Bach and others. Hofmann concludes from many corrections in Bach's autograph that the aria is a new composition. He sees the "agility of the organ part which does not follow the siciliano pattern" as an image of the "confusion" mentioned in the text.

3 
A secco recitative, "" (I am amazed), expresses awe at the creation, rendered in the first person which according to Mincham underlines the cantata's "personal and individual emphasis". Beginning in a major mode which contrasts with the preceding aria, it turns to "the solemnity of the minor mode".

4 
An aria with obbligato organ, "" (God has made everything well), is the first movement in a major mode, expressing pleasure with God's creation. It has a dominating two-part ritornello. Hofmann observes that the organ, this time the only partner of the voice, is "rich in coloratura" and has a theme, "heard throughout the movement, sometimes in the manner of an ostinato, sometimes freely developed; in its figuration and motoric drive it is stylized just like Bach’s writing for the violoncello piccolo". Gardiner notes that not only the tessitura but also "characteristic string-crossing patterns" are reminiscent of violoncello piccolo use.

5 
Part 2 begins with another sinfonia, this time in binary form. Hofmann describes it as "an engaging perpetuum mobile introduced by the keyboard". It may be based on the final movement of a concerto. The organ interacts with the orchestra without a prelude, which is unusual in Bach's concertos, but not without precedent, such as the harpsichord concerto in F major, BWV 1057

6 
Another secco recitative, "" (Ah, powerful God, let me [think upon this continually]), is a prayer for the ability to always reflect on the miracle of creation. It quotes Jesus saying "Hephata" (Be opened) to the deaf mute man, and turns it to "the believer's heart would open up and his tongue would be loosened so that he might perceive and praise the divine miracles".

7 
The cantata concludes with an aria with the complete orchestra, "" (I wish to live with God alone). It expresses the wish to dwell with God forever in a minuet of positive character. The movement again uses a two-part ritornello. When contrasting aspects of life on earth are mentioned, such as "jammerreichen Schmerzensjoch" (sorrowful yoke of pain) and "martervollen Leben" (tormented life), the music darkens to minor keys. The organ supplies triplet figures, which the voice also uses to express "ein fröhliches Halleluja" (a joyful hallelujah).

Recordings 
The table is based on the listing on the Bach Cantatas website. Ensembles playing period instruments in historically informed performance are marked by a green background.

{| class="wikitable plainrowheaders"
|-
! scope="col" | Title
! scope="col" | Conductor / Ensemble
! scope="col" | Soloists
! scope="col" | Label
! scope="col" | Year
! scope="col" | 
|-

References

External links 
 Geist und Seele wird verwirret, BWV 35: performance by the Netherlands Bach Society (video and background information)

Church cantatas by Johann Sebastian Bach
1726 compositions